Mohammad Hairol bin Mokhtar (born 24 October 1984 in Kuching, Sarawak) is a Malaysian footballer who plays as a centre-back for Kuching City.

Career

Sarawak
Hairol started out playing for hometown club Dewan Bandaraya Kuching Utara (DBKU) in Kuching Premier League (Liga Perdana Kuching) since 2006. In 2008, he helped Samarahan district to win Sarawak Cup (Piala Sarawak). He signed his first professional contract with Sarawak in 2010 and managed to get into Sarawak's first team by 2011. Hairol replaced Zamri Morshidi as Sarawak captain for the 2012 season. In 2013, he won the Liga Premier with Sarawak getting them promoted.

In September 2016 Hairol was suspended for 6 months and fined RM 2,000 by the Football Association of Malaysia for attacking a referee during a match against Kedah in the Malaysian Cup.

National Team
In September 2013, Hairol received his first national called up for international 'A' match against China. He made his international debut in the 88th minute of the match replacing Amri Yahyah.

Kuching FA
In 2019, Hairol had join Kuching that will play in League M3, which seen that followed by other teammates Joseph, Dzulazlan, Hafis Saperi, Mazwandi, Ramesh and Iqbal Suhaimi

Honours

Domestic
Sarawak
 Malaysia Premier League: 2013

External links

References

1984 births
Living people
Malaysian footballers
Malaysia international footballers
Sarawak FA players
Kuching City F.C. players
People from Sarawak
People from Kuching
Malaysia Super League players
Malaysia Premier League
Association football defenders